Thottopalayam thottimvirus, formerly Thottapalayam virus, (TMPV) is single-stranded, enveloped, negative-sense RNA virus species of the genus Thottimvirus in the Bunyavirales order. It is the first hantavirus to be isolated from a shrew. It was discovered in India in 1964.

Natural reservoir 
TPMV was first isolated from an Asian house shrew (Suncus murinus) in India in 1964. It is part of a group of hantaviruses which are hosted by shrews instead of rodents. These shrew-borne thottimviruses are not known to cause any known disease in humans, unlike the similar and related orthohantaviruses including Andes and Hantaan viruses, which cause lethal hemorrhagic fevers. 

TPMV was  first isolated in Asian house shrews in Wenzhou of Zhejiang province, China.

Virology 
Phylogenetic analysis has shown that Thottapalayam virus, and its closely related strains, is unique and forms a distinct lineage, unrelated to other hantaviruses. The closest hantavirus to TMPV is Imjin virus which demonstrates corresponding nucleotide sequences to TPMV as does Tanganya virus.

See also 
RNA virus
Puumala virus

References

External links 
 CDC's Hantavirus Technical Information Index page
 Virus Pathogen Database and Analysis Resource (ViPR): Bunyaviridae

Viral diseases
Hantaviridae
Hemorrhagic fevers
Rodent-carried diseases